Wolf Frameworks is a web application designing and development platform as a service based in India and United States and represented via partners worldwide.

Founded in 2006, the cloud computing Infrastructure offered by the company enables users to design & deliver cross platform SaaS applications without writing technical code.

Product
WOLF is 100% AJAX, XML and .NET based and enables building of mashable and interoperable web applications by using a browser, an internet connection and the knowledge of modelling business.

Features
 A technical code free designing environment for creating & delivering SaaS type business applications on the Internet
Built using a late bound SOA architecture which uses XML framework
Prevents cloud lock-in by allowing users to save their application data in their own preferred database server
Provides the ability to view & extract the Business Design (Intellectual Property) of your software application in XML.
Import, Export or filter data from Word, Excel, Project Management or CSV files
Accessed over a 128-bit secured SSL connection and hosted in a highly secured data center

Benefits
 Multi-tenant SOA
 Requires no coding & less technical skills 
 Built-in actions to integrate with external software systems
 Standards oriented web service technology
 Save data in a private database server & extract Application Design in XML
 Requires no up-front capital expenses and minimizes operational cost

References

Web applications
Privately held companies of India
Cloud computing providers
Cloud platforms